The 1979 Country Music Association Awards, 13th Ceremony, was held on October 8, 1979, at the Grand Ole Opry House, Nashville, Tennessee, and was hosted by CMA Award winner Kenny Rogers.

Winners and nominees 
Winners in Bold.

Country Music Hall of Fame 

 Hubert Long
 Hank Snow

References 

Country Music Association Awards
Country Music Association Awards
CMA
Country Music Association Awards
Country Music Association Awards
Country Music Association Awards
20th century in Nashville, Tennessee
Events in Nashville, Tennessee